Karen Kelly is a camogie player and teacher, winner of two Soaring Star awards in 2009 and 2011 and played in the 2009 All Ireland junior camogie final. The leading scorer in her side's impressive march to the final, Karen has won two National League medals, Munster titles in the Junior and Intermediate grades, as well as six Senior county championships with a club. With a total of 4-38 she was the highest scoring player in the Kay Mills Cup of 2011.

References

External links 
 Official Camogie Website
 Waterford GAA website
 of 2009 championship in On The Ball Official Camogie Magazine
 Video Highlights of 2009 All Ireland Junior Final
 Report of Offaly v Waterford 2009 All Ireland junior final in Irish Times Independent, Examiner and Offaly Express.
 Video highlights of 2009 championship Part One and part two

1983 births
Living people
Irish schoolteachers
Waterford camogie players
Waterford IT camogie players